Synoicus is a genus of 4 species of Old World quail.

The species in the genus are distributed throughout Sub-Saharan Africa, tropical Asia, and Australasia. Two of the four species in the genus were originally classified in Excalfactoria, one was classified in Anurophasis, and one was classified in Coturnix. Several phylogenetic studies found these species to all group together into a single genus, which was followed by the International Ornithological Congress in 2021.

Species

References 

Synoicus
Bird genera